Marie Lataste (21 February 1822 at Mimbaste near Dax, Landes, France – 10 May 1847 at Rennes) was a French Roman Catholic visionary, nun and writer.

Life

She was the youngest child of pious Catholic peasants.  A troublesome child, proud, ambitious, and self-contained, she was the constant subject of her mother's prayers.  According to her own narrative, written under obedience, she was a poor, lowly, country girl, knowing nothing but what her mother taught her.

She received a strong impression of the Divine presence, aged 11, at her first Communion.  About a year after, Marie saw at Mass during the Elevation of the Host, a bright light which seemed to inflame her love for the Eucharistic Lord and to increase as that love increased. Soon she was cast into severe interior trials and temptations.  Her spiritual director allowed her to make a yearly vow of virginity, and the Blessed Sacrament became the central thought of her life. 

According to her own narrative, towards the end of 1839, when she was seventeen, she saw Christ on the altar.  On the Epiphany, 1840, this was repeated, and for three whole years every time she assisted at Mass this grace was granted her.  Almost daily she received from the lips of Jesus instructions forming a complete spiritual and doctrinal education. She never mentioned this except to her confessor.

In 1840 M. l'Abbé Pierre Darbins succeeded M. Farbos as curé of Mimbaste. Marie revealed her soul to him. He asked the help of the director of the seminary of Dax, and they agreed to order her to put in writing everything supernatural she had heard and seen in the past, and all she might hear and see in the future. 

After many objections and delays, she obtained permission to join the Society of the Sacred Heart, recently founded, and left for Paris, 21 April 1844, alone.  She was received at the Hôtel Biron by Madame de Boisbaudry, who had her examined by an experienced spiritual guide.  She was admitted as a lay sister on May 15. 

Still a novice, she was sent to Rennes in the hope that a change of air would improve her health. Marie's vows had been postponed in the hope of an improvement in her health. But on Sunday, May 9, she became suddenly so very ill that the end seemed near.  She was allowed to pronounce her vows, just before receiving the last sacraments. 

Her remains were later taken to Roehampton, near London.

Works

The true text has been so much interpolated by the editor that the Works of Marie Lataste are not considered authentic.

References

Attribution

1822 births
1847 deaths
19th-century French nuns